Andrés Eloy Blanco Meaño (6 August 1896 – 21 May 1955) was a noted Venezuelan poet and politician. He was a member of the Generación del 28, and one of the founders of Acción Democrática (AD). He was Minister of Foreign Affairs of Venezuela from 15 February 1948 until 24 November 1948.

Biography
He was born in Cumaná, Sucre state, Venezuela, 6 August 1896. Blanco's family settled on Margarita Island, (Nueva Esparta State) where he lived part of his childhood. Until he moved to Caracas to attend classes at Universidad Central de Venezuela.

He earned his first award in 1918 by writing the pastoral poem Canto a la Espiga y al Arado, and released his first drama play, El Huerto de la Epopeya. That year he was put in jail by protesting against the government. In 1923 got his first prize at the Juegos Florales (Floral Games) in Santander, Cantabria, Spain with the poem Canto a España (A Song to Spain). He traveled to Spain to receive the reward and stayed there for more than a year.

He was Minister of Foreign Affairs of Venezuela from 15 February 1948 until 24 November 1948.. In 1948 Blanco was exiled to Mexico City and Pedro Infante sings the song "Angelitos Negros" in the homonymous film inspired by his poem  set to music by the Mexican composer Manuel Álvarez Maciste. It's a protest against racism.

He died in Mexico City, Mexico, 21 May 1955. Several Venezuelan municipalities are named in his honor.

Bibliography
 Tierras que me oyeron (1921)
 Poda (1934)
 La Aeroplana Clueca (1935)
 Baedeker 2000 (1935)
 Barco de Piedra (1937)
 Abigaíl (1937)
 Malvina recobrada (1938)
 Liberación y Siembra (1938)
 Angelitos Negros (Black Little Angels) (1943)
 El Poeta y el pueblo (1954)
 Giraluna (1955)
 La Juanbimbada (1959)

See also
List of Ministers of Foreign Affairs of Venezuela

References

 "Andrés Eloy Blanco"
 Andrés Eloy Blanco biography
 Francisco Escamilla-Vera. Andrés Eloy Blanco (1896–1955). Barcelona: Biblio 3W – REVISTA BIBLIOGRÁFICA DE GEOGRAFÍA Y CIENCIAS SOCIALES (Serie documental de Geo Crítica), Universidad de Barcelona. Vol. IX, nº 550, 5 de diciembre de 2004 .
 Luis Chesney Lawrence (Universidad Central de Venezuela, Caracas). Venezuelan dramatists in shadows: Andrés Eloy Blanco. In Spanish .

External links
 Andres Eloy Blanco recorded at the Library of Congress for the Hispanic Division's audio literary archive on 23 November 1943.

  

 

1896 births
1955 deaths
People from Cumaná
Venezuelan male poets
Venezuelan Ministers of Foreign Affairs
Central University of Venezuela alumni
Road incident deaths in Mexico
Democratic Action (Venezuela) politicians
Presidents of the Venezuelan Chamber of Deputies
Venezuelan expatriates in Mexico
Burials at the National Pantheon of Venezuela
20th-century Venezuelan poets
20th-century male writers
Prisoners and detainees of Venezuela
Generation of 1928
Members of the Venezuelan Constituent Assembly of 1946